Amharclann Ghaoth Dobhair, anglicized as Gweedore Theatre, is a local theatre in the Gaeltacht region of Derrybeg in the parish of Gweedore, County Donegal, Ireland. It seats over 200 patrons, and ever since it was opened by actress Siobhán McKenna, it has staged hundreds of plays in the Irish language.

Aisteoirí Ghaoth Dobhair was a group of actors founded in Srath na Corcra, Derrybeg in 1932, and they gained critical acclaim and travelled as far as Glasgow to perform. The key people involved in the group were Eoghan Mac Giolla Bhríghde, Áine Nic Giolla Bhríghde, Johnnie Sheáin Ó Gallchóir, Proinsias Ó Maonaigh, Máire Bn. Uí Bhraonáin, Tomás Mac Giolla Bhríghde, Seán Ó Casaide, Néilí Ó Maolagáin, Niall Ó Dufaigh, and Proinsias Ó Duibhir.

Aisteoirí Ghaoth Dobhair's Pantomimes 
Several well-known local entertainers took to the limelight in productions of Geamaireachtaí Aisteoirí Ghaoth Dobhair. Eithne Ní Bhraonáin from Dore - now globally known as Enya. Mairéad Ní Mhaonaigh - now of Altan fame. Máire Ní Bhraonáin - now known as Moya Brennan. Three of the Uí Chasaide clan Na Casaidigh. And the two Brennan brothers Pól and Ciarán of internationally renowned group Clannad. They all took part in the pantos before taking to the world-stage. The pantomimes have included the below productions:
 1962 - Turloch Óg na dTuath
 1963 - Ball Dearg
 1964 - An tSleagh Ghlas
 1965 - Fionnán in Arabia
 1967 - An Gobán Saor
 1968 - An Glas Gaibhlinn
 1970 - Mac Rí Uladh
 1973 - Iníon Rí Ailigh

References

Buildings and structures in Gweedore
Culture in Gweedore
Theatres in the Republic of Ireland
Tourist attractions in County Donegal
1962 establishments in Ireland